Anus is a populated place in Burgundy, France, within the commune of Fouronnes.

Anus was anciently parished with Fouronnes, the parish sometimes being called Fouronne et Anus. In 1848, the two together had seventy households, of which nineteen were at Anus. In the 16th century, Anus had its own seigneur, who in 1598 was Guillaume Girard.

References

Geography of Yonne